Leoš Svárovský (born 17 May 1961 in Jablonec nad Nisou, former Czechoslovakia) is a Czech flautist and conductor.

He began his musical career as a flautist after studying at the Prague Conservatory. By 1981 he was a renowned soloist. He studied until 1987 at the Czech Academy of Music and Dramatic Art, starting his conducting career in 1985.

References

External links
Leoš Svárovský Official Website 
Biography (in Czech)

Czech conductors (music)
Male conductors (music)
Czech classical flautists
Living people
1961 births
21st-century conductors (music)
21st-century Czech male musicians
21st-century flautists